In computing, UMA Acceleration Architecture (UXA) is the reimplementation of the EXA graphics acceleration architecture of the X.Org Server developed by Intel. Its major difference with EXA is the use of GEM, replacing Translation Table Maps. In February 2009 it became clear that UXA would not be merged back into EXA.

Intel is transitioning from UXA to SNA.

Implementations
In May 2009 it was announced that Ubuntu would migrate their graphics acceleration for the Ubuntu 9.10 release to UXA.

See also
 Direct Rendering Infrastructure
 Mesa 3D
 EGL

References

X-based libraries